"Here's to You" is a song by Ennio Morricone and Joan Baez, released in 1971 as part of the soundtrack of the film Sacco & Vanzetti, directed by Giuliano Montaldo. The song was written by Baez and Morricone themselves. The lyrics are only four lines of text, sung over and over. In the United States and internationally, the song became a veritable symbol for the human rights movement of the 1970s.

Background
The song is a tribute to two anarchists of Italian origin, Nicola Sacco and Bartolomeo Vanzetti who were sentenced to death by a United States court in the 1920s.  Mainstream opinion has concluded since that the ruling was based on abhorrence to their anarchist political beliefs rather than on any proof that they committed the robbery and murders of which they were accused.  

Despite the weaknesses of the jury's decision, correspondence by the novelist Upton Sinclair to his lawyer John Beardsley (penned in 1929 and unearthed in 2005) corroborated the guilty verdict against Sacco and Vanzetti for the murder of a payroll clerk and his guard.  Sinclair told Beardsley that he had met with Sacco and Vanzetti's defense attorney, Fred Moore, and Moore informed the famous author that his clients were guilty as charged.  Moreover, several forensic experts agreed that Sacco fired a shot from his Colt pistol at the scene of the crime.  

Thus, "Here's to You" contributes to the notion of the pair's innocence in the face of a supposedly bigoted American public.  The case is known as the Sacco and Vanzetti Affair.

The lyrics for "Here's to You" make use of a statement attributed to Vanzetti by Philip D. Strong, a reporter for the North American Newspaper Alliance, who visited Vanzetti in prison in May 1927, three months before his execution.

Lyrics
Here's to you, Nicola and Bart
Rest forever here in our hearts
The last and final moment is yours
That agony is your triumph.

Use in other media
Besides the film Sacco e Vanzetti, the song also appears in the 1977 quasi-documentary film Deutschland im Herbst, accompanying footage of the 1977 funeral march for Red Army Faction members Andreas Baader, Gudrun Ensslin, and Jan-Carl Raspe, who had purportedly committed suicide in prison (see German Autumn).

The song is used in the 2004 film The Life Aquatic with Steve Zissou.

The song also appears in the opening sequence, as well as credits of the 2014 video game Metal Gear Solid V: Ground Zeroes produced by Hideo Kojima; a cover version also used as the end theme for its predecessor Metal Gear Solid 4: Guns of the Patriots (2008), which was also produced by Kojima.

Cover versions 
In 1972 the German songwriter Franz Josef Degenhardt sang the song under the title "Sacco und Vanzetti," with five verses. The Israeli singer Daliah Lavi sang it in English, French and German. Swedish singer-songwriter Agnetha Fältskog recorded the song in German and released it as a single in 1972, entitled "Geh' mit Gott". Another German cover version in Colognian dialect titled "Die Stadt" ('The Town') was created and sung by Comedian Trude Herr in 1987 and lateron by the group Höhner.

In 1974 Mireille Mathieu covered the song as "La Marche de Sacco et Vanzetti" on her album Mireille Mathieu Chante Ennio Morricone. In 1997, Nana Mouskouri interpreted it with Les Enfoirés, starting with a classical rendering that develops into a blues song, intermittent with versions of Georges Moustaki in French and finally in English..

British composer Harry Gregson-Williams orchestrated a cover of "Here's to You," featuring vocals by Lisbeth Scott. This version is heard during the end credits of the 2008 game Metal Gear Solid 4: Guns of the Patriots. In 2011, Bandista covered the song with the name "Selam size" on their album Daima!. Hayley Westenra and Ennio Morricone performed "Here's To You" on the album Paradiso, released in 2011 and nominated for a 2012 Classic Brit Award. Corsica-based band L'Arcusgi used "Here's to You" music in their 2011 song "Alba Nova" (in Corsican "A New Dawn").

References

1971 songs
1971 singles
Ennio Morricone songs
Joan Baez songs
Songs written for films
Songs written by Joan Baez
Commemoration songs
Works about Sacco and Vanzetti
Anarchist songs
RCA Victor singles